Samuel Onyemelukwe is a Nigerian media and entertainment entrepreneur. He is vice the managing director, West African region for Trace, an entertainment company focused on Afro-urban culture in Africa. His company, Venator Partners was the master license holder of Trace Africa.

Education and career 
Onyemelukwe earned a bachelor of Art in Fine Arts from the University of Southern California and an MBA and Master’s in Information Technology from Boston University. After graduation, he started his career at Walt Disney in Burbank, California. In 2009, he returned to Africa and joined Viacom Media as MTV Network, Business Development Manager, Nigeria.

Onyemelukwe acquired a master license to Trace TV in West Africa in 2011 and is recognised for turning Trace TV one of the popular entertainment companies in Africa. He has launched several popular TV channels such as Trace Naija and Trace Gospel on DSTV and STV Music on Startimes. He is currently Senior Vice President of Global Business Development for Trace.

References 

Nigerian television company founders
University of Southern California alumni
Boston University College of Arts and Sciences alumni
Year of birth missing (living people)
Living people